is a Japanese shōjo manga artist. She is best known for Kimi no te ga Sasayaite iru ("Your Hands Are Whispering"), about a romance between a deaf woman and a hearing man, for which she won the 1994 Kodansha Manga Award for shōjo.

References

External links 
 Profile at The Ultimate Manga Page

Manga artists
Women manga artists
Winner of Kodansha Manga Award (Shōjo)
Japanese female comics artists
Female comics writers
Living people
Japanese women writers
Year of birth missing (living people)